Norbert Perrimon (born October 24, 1958) is a geneticist and developmental biologist at Harvard Medical School.  He is known for developing a number of techniques for use of Drosophila, as well as specific substantive contributions to signal transduction and developmental biology.  Perrimon co-developed the GAL4/UAS system method, described as “a fly geneticist's Swiss army knife”,  with Andrea Brand to control gene expression. With Tze-bin Chou he developed the FLP-FRT DFS method to analyze the maternal effect of zygotic lethal mutations. With Jianquan Ni, he developed and improved methods for in vivo RNAi. His lab has pioneered high-throughput whole-genome RNAi screening.

In 2003 he created the Drosophila RNAi Screening Center at Harvard Medical School and in 2008, he initiated the Transgenic RNAi Project to generate transgenic RNAi lines for the community using optimized shRNA vectors that his lab developed.

Education
Perrimon was born in 1958 in Bosguérard-de-Marcouville, France.  He earned his undergraduate degree (Maitrise of Biochemistry) at the University of Paris VI, in 1981, then completed his doctorate in 1983 with Madeleine Gans, also at the University of Paris.

Career
From 1983 to 1986 Perrimon was a postdoctoral researcher with Anthony Mahowald at Case Western Reserve University, and in 1986 at the age of {{#expr:(1986)-(1958)-((0)<(10)or(0)=(10)and(0)<(24))}} he accepted appointment as faculty at Harvard Medical School. He is currently the James Stillman Professor of Developmental Biology in the Department of Genetics at Harvard Medical School. He has been an Investigator of the Howard Hughes Medical Institute since 1986.

Awards and honors
Perrimon was elected to the United States National Academy of Sciences in April 2013, after naturalizing as an American citizen.

 Lucille P. Markey Scholar in Biomedical Sciences, 1985.
 Investigator, Howard Hughes Medical Institute, 1986–present
 Chaire d’Etat. College de France. Paris, 2003
 George W. Beadle Medal, Genetics Society of America, 2004
 RNAi Innovator Award, 2009
 Fellow of the American Academy of Arts and Sciences, 2008
 Fellow of the American Association for the Advancement of Science, 2009
 Associate member of the European Molecular Biology Organization (EMBO) 2011
 Fellow of the United States National Academy of Sciences, 2013

References

Living people
1958 births
French geneticists
Developmental biologists
University of Paris alumni
Harvard Medical School faculty
Members of the United States National Academy of Sciences